Traffic cones, also called pylons, witches' hats, road cones, highway cones, safety cones, channelizing devices, construction cones, or just cones, are usually cone-shaped markers that are placed on roads or footpaths to temporarily redirect traffic in a safe manner. They are often used to create separation or merge lanes during road construction projects or automobile accidents, although heavier, more permanent markers or signs are used if the diversion is to stay in place for a long period of time.

History
Traffic cones were invented by Charles D. Scanlon, an American who, while working as a painter for the Street Painting Department of the City of Los Angeles, was unimpressed with the traditional wooden tripods and barriers used to mark roads which were damaged or undergoing repainting. Scanlon regarded these wooden structures as easily broken, hard to see, and a hazard to passing traffic. Scanlon's rubber cone was designed to return to an upright position when struck by a glancing blow. The patent for his invention was granted in 1943.

Traffic cones were first used in the United Kingdom in 1958, when the M6 motorway opened. These traffic cones were a substitute for red lantern paraffin burners being used during construction on the Preston Bypass.  In 1961, David Morgan of Burford, Oxfordshire, UK believes that he constructed the first experimental plastic traffic cones, which replaced pyramid-shaped wooden ones previously used.

In the United States on May 1, 1959 the Pacific Gas and Electric Company in Oakland, California adopted the policy of placing the orange safety cones at the left front and left rear corners of their service trucks while parked on the street to increase visibility and safety for the workers. This policy was implemented as the result of a suggestion by their employee, Russell Storch, a cable splicer. He was awarded $45 for his suggestion. This policy is still in use today.

Although originally made of concrete, today's versions are more commonly brightly colored thermoplastic or rubber cones. Recycled PVCs from bottles can be used to create modern traffic cones. Not all traffic cones are conical. Pillar-shaped movable bollards fulfill a similar function.

Usage

Traffic management 

Traffic cones are typically used outdoors during road work or other situations requiring traffic redirection or advance warning of hazards or dangers, or the prevention of traffic. Traffic cones are also used to mark where children are playing or to block off an area. For night time use or low-light situations traffic cones are usually fitted with a retroreflective sleeve to increase visibility. On occasion, traffic cones may also be fitted with flashing lights for the same reason.

In the US, cones are required by the US Federal Highway Administration's Manual on Uniform Traffic Control Devices (MUTCD) to be fitted with reflective white bands to increase night-time visibility. Reflective collars, white strips made from white reflective plastic, slip over cones snugly, and tape or adhesive can be used to permanently attach the collars to the cones.

Traffic cones are designed to be highly visible and easily movable. Traffic cones come in many different colors, with orange, yellow, pink and red being the most common colors due to their brightness. Others come in green and blue, and may also have a retroreflective strip (commonly known as "flash tape") to increase their visibility.

Types and sizes 

Typical traffic cones are fluorescent "safety" orange or lime green, but in some countries a range of other colors are used depending on context. Traffic cones also commonly come with reflective striping around them, to increase visibility.

In the United States, they come in such sizes as:
 ,  – for indoor/outdoor applications
 ,  – for outdoor applications such as free-way line painting
Local street, 
 ,  – for free-way/high-way applications (With reflective stripes)
 ,  – for free-way/high-way applications (With reflective stripes)

In New Zealand, they are compliant in two sizes for use on all roads; these are:

 35 in (900mm), up to 16.5 lb (7 kg) - for all activities on all roads. (with two reflective stripes)
 17.7 in (450mm), up to 16.5 lb (7 kg) - for the protection of wet road markings only. (with one reflective stripe)

Other forms 
Cones are easy to move or remove. Where sturdier (and larger) markers are needed, construction sites use traffic barrels (plastic orange barrels with reflective stripes, normally about the same size as a  drum). When a lane closure must also be a physical barrier against cars accidentally crossing it, a Jersey barrier is preferred. See also Fitch Barrier.

In many countries such as Australia or American states such as California, traffic barrels are rarely seen. Devices called bollards are used instead of cones where larger and sturdier warning or delineation devices are needed. Larger devices such as barrier boards may be used instead of cones where larger areas need to be excluded or for longer periods.

Indoor and non-traffic use 
Cones are used to lay out courses for autocross competitions.

Cones are also frequently used in indoor public spaces to mark off areas which are closed to pedestrians, such as a restroom being out of order, or to denote a dangerous condition, such as a slippery floor. They can be used on school playgrounds to limit areas of a playing field, and on ice rinks to define class, private party, or private lesson areas.

Being distinctive, easily portable and usually left unguarded, traffic cones are often stolen. Students are frequently blamed, to the extent that the British National Union of Students has attempted to play down this "outdated stereotype".

In popular culture 

In 2007, artist Dennis Oppenheim commemorated the traffic cone with a monumental sculpture of five five-metre-tall cones. They were installed temporarily in Miami, Seattle's Olympic Sculpture Park, and Seoul, Korea.

An orange-and-white cone is the logo used by VideoLAN (best known for its VLC media player software).

German group Kraftwerk featured traffic cones on their first two albums, as well as in their concerts at the time.

Traditionally, but unofficially, the Wellington Statue in Glasgow is decorated with a traffic cone. The presence of the cone is given as the reason the statue is in the Lonely Planet 1000 Ultimate Sights guide (at number 229) as a "most bizarre monument".

Television 
The Traffic Cones is a Belgian TV series on Nickelodeon.

See also 

 Amsterdammertje
 Bollard
 Cones Hotline
 Construction barrel
 Road traffic control
 Traffic barrier
 Traffic guard

References

External links 

 wikt:traffic cone
 Federal Highway Administration Manual on Uniform Traffic Control Devices

American inventions
Road safety
Road transport
Safety equipment
Streetworks
Traffic signs
1914 introductions